Andrew Stanislaus (Andrzej Stanisław) Ciechanowiecki (28 September 1924 – 2 November 2015), Dąbrowa Coat of Arms, was a Polish-British nobleman, diplomat, prisoner and agent of Communist Poland, economist, academic, art historian, philanthropist, art collector, antique dealer, antiquarian and exhibition curator. He was considered an authority on French baroque sculpture in the second half of the 20th century.

He was founder of the Ciechanowiecki Foundation at the Royal Castle in Warsaw (1986), Honorary Professor of the Academy of Fine Arts in Warsaw, member of the Polish Academy of Sciences, Honorary Member or Life Member of many learned societies both British and Polish, FSA, member of the board of trustees of the Royal Castle in Warsaw, and member of the board of the Lanckoroński Foundation. He was also a council member of the Princes Czartoryski Foundation from its establishment until July 2011, the Raczyński Foundation, and the Polish Historical and Literary Society in Paris (SHLP), chairman of the Polish-Belarusian Bilateral Commission for the Conservation of National Patrimony.

He was a prominent member of the Sovereign Military Order of Malta and the Sacred Military Constantinian Order of Saint George. His distinctions included the Order of the White Eagle (1998), Grand Cross of Polonia Restituta and war medals, the Gloria Artis Gold Medal, among other awards.

While there is no doubt about his considerable academic and business achievements and his subsequent generosity in restoring some of Poland's pillaged cultural heritage, his wartime and immediate post-war activities remain unclear. A lack of clarity also applies to the origins of Ciechanowiecki's restored title of "Count".

Biography

Early life to 1945
Andrew Ciechanowiecki was born in Warsaw in 1924, the only child of Jerzy Stanisław Ciechanowiecki, a Polish diplomat, and Matilda,"Tilly", née Countess Osiecimska-Hutten-Czapska, a prominent figure in the élite social circles of pre-war Warsaw. On his father's side, he came from an impoverished Masovian noble and senatorial family, established in Belarus, and who had recently lost their landed estates as a result of the Treaty of Riga (1921), when they fell to Soviet control. He had spent his early childhood in Budapest, where his father died at the early age of 37 while working at the Polish embassy, obliging the family to return to Warsaw. There he attended the Mikołaj Rey Primary School followed by the Stefan Batory Gimnazjum & Liceum. The household came to be dominated by his widowed mother and maternal grandmother and their social connections. Ciechanowiecki later attributed his multilingual skills and lifelong academic discipline to their influence.

Ciechanowiecki's war

The German invasion of Poland began on 1 September 1939. On the advice – seriously flawed, as it turned out – of British general, Sir Adrian Carton de Wiart, resident in Poland, on 5 September, the family fled East. They went to stay in Mołodów, Polesie Voivodeship on the estate of Henryk Skirmunt and his sister, Maria, the younger siblings of Konstanty Skirmunt, Polish ambassador in London (1919–1934). The plan had been to overwinter there and that Ciechanowiecki should attend school in nearby Pinsk. On 17 September invading Soviet units laid siege to the small town. Elements of local Belarusian activists presented an ultimatum to the Skirmunts: that the 150 Polish military police stationed on their estate should lay down their arms or all the buildings would be set alight. The unworldly Skirmunts fell for the trap; the police were all shot with their own weapons, the elderly Skirmunts were slaughtered in the woods and all the premises looted. Ciechanowiecki and his family managed to flee the horror with the retreating Polish columns of general Franciszek Kleeberg. Ciechanowiecki later stated laconically: "...coś tam pomagałem, mam nawet krzyż za kampanię wrześniową jako ochotnik." – I helped out a bit, I even have a cross for the September campaign, as a volunteer. They travelled via Kamien Koszyrski to Kowel, then by train, strafed by Soviet planes, on to Lwów. There they suffered a harsh winter and a failed attempt in December to cross the Green frontier into Romania. They left the city in March 1940, just two days ahead of the KGB's arrival to start mass deportations. Recrossing the new frontier, they finally returned to Warsaw in early May 1940.

Back at his old school, he obtained his baccalauréat in 1942 through "clandestine classes", Komplety, together with classmates later to become "luminaries" of Polish higher education such as, Professors: Jerzy Kroh, J.A. Miłobędzki, J. Pelc and K. Szaniawski. The class was later dubbed the "professorial cohort"; of the group, only Ciechanowiecki did not become a professor, he later quipped. After leaving school he had to look for paid employment, did some charity work and enrolled on a degree course at the school of Professor Edward Lipiński, an underground version of the earlier SGH. To "distract" himself from difficult wartime conditions he decided to join an Art History course at the Uniwersytet Ziem Zachodnich (Western University) unaware of how portentous it would become. It enabled him to attend the lectures of professor Tatarkiewicz "on themes like, happiness, in the light of a Carbide lamp in a chilly suburban room." In between these many courses, he attended Home Army training classes for cadets.

At some stage he became secretary to the politician, Adam Ronikier, an interlocutor with the German high command in occupied Warsaw. Presumably he remained in that position for the 63-day duration of the Warsaw Uprising that erupted on 1 August 1944. After the collapse of the Warsaw Uprising and conclusion of hostilities on 5 October, he did not leave the battered capital with the columns of captive Home Army fighters nor with the destitute civilian population. He left ten days later with the Red cross. By his own account, he visited Pruszków, the vast German holding camp for POWs and "went on Home Army missions in the provinces". He went to Kraków, where he was briefly arrested by the Germans, then released. Such circumstances were extraordinary for a young intelligent man of his age at that time, who was likely to have been a resistance member and therefore a suspect, unless he had "special protection". His bid to travel with Ronikier was refused and by the end of January 1945 he was back in Warsaw. His claim to have worked for a short spell with the anti-communist Freedom and Independence organisation, (Wolność i Niezawisłość), until the spring of 1945 does not stand up since it was not founded till September of that year.

Polish People's Republic
Having decided not to escape to the West, in June 1945 he applied to the newly installed government of the People’s Republic of Poland to join the Polish Ministry of Foreign Affairs. Because of his knowledge of several languages, aged just 21, he was employed in the rank of Counsellor. He was assigned as Chief of Protocol to the Ministry of Shipping & Foreign Trade. In that capacity he participated in numerous negotiations with foreign delegations in Warsaw. In August 1945 he was a member of the Polish Delegation, as its interpreter, to the UNRRA Conference held in London. In the autumn of that year he was appointed counsellor to the embassy in the Hague, but that appointment was cancelled for political reasons, due to his origins and his alleged Home Army past. He returned to Kraków to complete his studies – firstly at the Academy of Economics, obtaining his degree in 1947 and then in the Faculty of History of Art of the Jagiellonian University, gaining his Master of Arts degree in March 1950. At the same time, he was involved in student activities and was the founder of the Club of the Logophagoi, (Klub Logofagów), a debating society which comprised many prominent students and young scholars – some eminent politicians and scholars were to emerge from its ranks. The club was also the prototype for later clubs of the Catholic intelligentsia, which was preparing for the fall of Communism.

Imprisonment
Having completed his studies, he was almost immediately appointed lecturer at the Institute of History of Art. Work on his doctoral thesis was interrupted by his arrest on 22 October 1950. Transported immediately to Warsaw in connection with the staged "British Embassy" Show trial and after lengthy interrogations, he was sentenced to ten years in prison in February 1952 for allegedly helping British and Vatican spies, as well as for extending his underground activities beyond the official date for disclosure, which, in any case, would probably have led to an earlier arrest. He spent five years and four months in prison in difficult conditions – firstly on remand in the cellars of the Ministry of Public Security in Koszykowa Street, and later in the infamous Mokotów Prison, both in Warsaw, and finally – after sentencing – in the prisons of Rawicz and Wronki. In the latter two he actively organised spiritual help for his fellow prisoners. Having got himself work in the prison hospital, he was instrumental in forging documents enabling the early release of a very large number of political prisoners. He himself was released on 6 March 1956 less than midway through his sentence. He was later cleared of all charges, probably in exchange for becoming an informer, especially on foreign trips.

Academic pursuits
Returning to Kraków, he took up his doctoral thesis and also worked on other research projects. He was a consultant at the Wawel Castle Museum and also a curator at the Castle Museum in Łańcut. His academic interests concentrated on the history of furniture and later on Kraków Baroque silver, as well as on the culture of the former Commonwealth of Poland. In 1958 he won a travel scholarship from the Ford Foundation and the British Council, leaving the country on 22 July of that year, presumably, not thinking that it would mean a 19-year break with his homeland. He did, however, take the precaution of bringing with him all his materials relating to his research, the subject of his doctoral thesis. Later he completed another thesis at University of Tübingen, Germany.

Activities in the West
After a 3-month stay in Great Britain, he spent another six months in the United States, visiting museums and lecturing on Polish culture.  He had offers of work and further scholarships, but he decided to return to Europe, where in the autumn of 1959 he enrolled at the University of Tübingen to prepare a further doctoral thesis, on a new topic, and for which he had fortunately taken most of the materials with him from Kraków. At the same time, he taught Polish Culture for two semesters and was a lecturer in Polish. A doctorate in philosophy (magna cum laude) was conferred on him at the University of Tübingen in July 1960. His dissertation Michał Kazimierz Ogiński und sein Musenhof zu Słonim was published in German in 1961. As a recognised work of reference, it was also translated into Belarusian in two editions (1993 and 2006).  He later spent a few months in Portugal on a Gulbenkian Foundation scholarship, the results of which were articles on Portuguese furniture.

Art dealership
In 1961, after much soul-searching, he decided to settle permanently in London, where he had been offered a directorship in the newly founded firm Mallett at Bourdon House, a subsidiary of Mallet & Son in Bond Street. That same year, with the help of Polish friends already permanently resident in the United Kingdom, he arranged for his mother, Matylda, to whom he was devoted to come and join him in Britain. He became a British subject in 1967.

During his time at Mallett's, he organised four innovative exhibitions on sculpture, mainly of the forgotten French 19th century, which were received with much critical acclaim. In 1965 he was invited to be co-organiser and co-owner of the newly opened London branch in Jermyn Street of the French Heim Gallery. Gradually he bought out his partners and finally became the gallery's sole owner. In 1991 he sold the Heim Gallery and opened a smaller specialist business named, The Old Masters Gallery, located opposite his previous gallery in Jermyn Street. He dealt from there until 1995, when as a result of a serious stroke he had to close the gallery and retire from business.

The innovative catalogues of the Heim Gallery became well known throughout the world and are to this day considered source material. They were copied by the main London auction houses and later by private galleries. He was also the first dealer in London for decades to present paintings, mainly Italian and French, from the 16th to the 19th centuries, together with sculpture which had been neglected for a long time. Sculpture became his main interest and the main element of the Heim Gallery's activities. The gallery specialised in Baroque and Neoclassical, as well as 19th-century art. The openings of exhibitions at the Heim Gallery were also innovative and became social and academic events in London. They were often opened in the presence of senior members of the Royal Family, twice by Queen Elizabeth The Queen Mother, members of the Government, ambassadors, and attended by scholars, society and museum directors.

In the professional field, Ciechanowiecki achieved major successes. He was the owner of one of the leading galleries of classical art in London, the organiser of over 40 significant exhibitions, which are still relevant today, was the initiator of interest in Baroque and Neoclassical art, especially French baroque sculpture. His enthusiasm for this period led to exports to major American and Continental museums. He was also the initiator and co-organiser of many important international exhibitions, including "Giambologna" (Edinburgh, London and Vienna), The Twilight of the Medici (Detroit, Florence), or The Golden Age of Naples (Naples and Detroit). He served on the Committees of other international exhibitions, which was unusual for a dealer in those days.

In his commercial activities, Ciechanowiecki always gave preference to British museums, in their pick of items at keen prices. This was his way of repaying a debt, in his own words, to the country of [his] happy adoption.

Art curator and collector
Finally, having established a good income stream, he began collecting works of Polish art and art connected with Poland, in the hope that they would ultimately reach his homeland. He was also the co-organiser of three major exhibitions including: Treasures of a Polish King at the Dulwich Gallery in London in 1992. Next was the exhibition on Polish Expressionism and The Land of the Winged Horsemen in museums in the USA. Travelling to the United States several times a year, he lectured extensively on the history of Polish Culture, particularly in Detroit, where he contributed to the creation of a Polish Section at the Detroit Institute of Arts. He also lectured in Britain and had articles published in various scholarly magazines. In 1986, when his collections had grown considerably in quantity (and from which he had already donated a number of items to Polish museums), he set up the Ciechanowiecki Foundation at the Royal Castle in Warsaw. The foundation distributes its holdings to other Polish museums on long-term loan, but predominantly it has been furnishing the rebuilt Royal Castle. He also gave the foundation a large library, his archives and a not inconsiderable sum for the upkeep of the collections. Since 1986 he had been enriching the foundation with numerous donations of significant importance, as well as books and archival material.

Knight of Malta
Ciechanowiecki had petitioned from Poland, as the first Pole from behind the Iron Curtain, and was probably among the first petitioners from Eastern Europe, to seek membership of the Sovereign & Military Order of Malta, SMOM, in 1957, although usually it is by invitation only. He was accepted into its ranks a year later by the Polish Association of the Order, then in exile. He later became its deputy chancellor, to Emeryk August Hutten-Czapski for 10 years, and vice-president until 1997. He initiated under its aegis the creation of a care home, Kolbe House, for Polish elderly in the outskirts of London, which later transferred to Warsaw, where it became far more significant. He rose through the ranks of the Order, finally becoming Bailiff Grand Cross of the Most Venerable Order of the Hospital of Saint John of Jerusalem.

He was also very active in various dynastic orders, especially those of the Bourbon-Two Sicilies dynasty, creating delegations to Poland, Great Britain and Ireland of the Sacred Military Constantinian Order of Saint George, serving under Grand Master, The Duke of Castro on the Order's Council in Rome.  He rose through the ranks and held uniquely the honours of Knight of the Order of St Januarius, Bailiff Grand Cross of Justice of the Sacred Military Constantinian Order of Saint George with Collar and Grand Cross of the Royal Order of Francis I.

He later formed the Delegation of the Order of St Maurice & St Lazarus of the Royal House of Savoy in the UK and in recent years helped to establish the Tuscan Dynastic Orders of St Stephen and that of St Joseph in Britain. He was also very close to the former Russian Imperial House and was decorated with the highest Orders of Imperial Russia.

His position in the Order of Malta and his personal relationships with the heads of former ruling houses as well as his quasi diplomatic activities in the fields of culture and ecclesiastical affairs were the grounds on which the last King of Italy, Umberto II, who although in exile, had kept his royal prerogatives in the field of Heraldry and confirmed Ciechanowiecki's "hereditary right" to use a comital title in 1975 – a foreign title allegedly "bestowed" on a family member more than 200 years ago. Two years later the Order of Malta confirmed this usage in all pertinent acts of the order internationally, as it maintains diplomatic relations with more than 100 sovereign states.

On behalf of the Polish Association of SMOM in the UK, he did much to support Polish charities during Martial law in Poland (1991–92), funded many scholarships and, on behalf of the Polish Association of the Knights of Malta contributed to the costs for the construction of the Church of St Maximilian Kolbe in the industrial suburb of Mistrzejowice on the outskirts of Kraków. It was the second church to be built in a secular Communist city (1975–1983). Its interior décor is mainly sculptural. He worked closely with Prof. Gustaw Ziemła, a noted Polish sculptor, to produce the décor of the Lady chapel, which has entered the canon of Polish post-war sculpture.

Recognition of the Jewish contribution
As co-founder of the Page of History Foundation, (Fundacja Karta z Dziejów), which commemorates the centuries of Jewish participation in the culture and life of Poland, he contributed financially and as its artistic advisor to the erection of the monument "The Ten Commandments" in Łódź and the statue of "David the Psalmist" in Zamość, both the work of Gustaw Zemła. Other works, sponsored by the foundation, are in the pipeline. He also deposited works of art from his own collections to decorate several Polish Embassies.

Philanthropy in Poland

Ciechanowiecki began to travel to Poland again in 1977, 19 years after his intended nine-month foreign trip on a scholarship. He had remained in close touch with his professors and colleagues in Poland and was particularly involved – even from London – in the rebuilding of the Royal Castle in Warsaw.  The foundation he created in 1986, now consisting of some 3000 items including paintings, drawings, furniture, silverware, textiles, miniatures, medals and jewels, is the single greatest donation that the Royal Castle in Warsaw has ever received. The foundation does not aim to have a building or rooms named after itself. It distributes works of art to other museums in Poland, depending on the needs of those institutions, but with priority given to the Royal Castle in Warsaw, which he has helped considerably in furnishing and decorating. The foundation has also financed various important publications, including the magisterial work on the history of Polish stately homes in the Kresy region of the Polish Second Republic, pre-war Poland, by Roman Aftanazy, 1st edition 1986, 2nd edition 1993, among other works.

Activities in Belarus
Andrew Ciechanowiecki, ever aware of the land of his Polish ancestors – namely, the territory of the former Grand Duchy of Lithuania and Belarus – was involved with the Belarusian émigré community in London and their cultural establishment. He also met scholars visiting London from Belarus, corresponded with them, and in 1987 was invited by its government to visit Belarus. As it was already autumn of that year, the visit was postponed till 1988. The visit was officially defined as "in the footsteps of the family": landing in St Petersburg, travelling to Minsk, via the family's former estates near Vitebsk and Polatsk, Mstsislau and Mahiliou. The return journey took him back to Minsk with a departure from Moscow. The fortnight's trip was during the short-lived period of political Détente. Many contacts were made and other trips to Belarus ensued, in collaboration with the appropriate Polish and British authorities advised. This all led to Ciechanowiecki's involvement in the preservation and conservation of historical monuments in Belarus, primarily the princely Radzivil residence in Niasvizh and its Collegiate Church.

Further to the decision of both Governments, Ciechanowiecki was appointed chairman of the Polish-Belarusian Bilateral Commission for the Conservation of the National Patrimony in 1993, and he continued as honorary chairman of this body, even latterly chairing meetings on several occasions. He was elected honorary chairman of the Belarusian Nobility Association, (which he founded), and honorary member of the International Association of Belarusian Studies, which he had also founded and chaired some of their meetings in Niasvizh, Minsk, Warsaw and Venice.

He was appointed an honorary member of the Institute of History of the Belarusian Academy of Sciences, and finally received an honorary doctorate from the Belarusian State University in Minsk.  He is quite active in Belarusian-British relations, being inter alia vice-president of the Anglo-Belarusian Society in London. He also made some significant gifts to Belarusian museums and, above all, he donated some reliquaries of Belarusian Catholic saints to churches in Belarus, and acted as a contact between the Belarusian Orthodox Church and the Vatican.

Old age and death
In 1995 Ciechanowiecki suffered a severe stroke, which deprived him of the use of his legs. He became confined to a wheelchair for the last twenty years of his life. However, he remained intellectually very active in the pursuit of his many interests. Above all, he continued with his numerous connections with Poland, where he still travelled several times a year to attend academic meetings, including those of his own Foundation, as well as to deal with the publication of various books, and also to pursue his para-diplomatic and political activities.

Ciechanowiecki never married and was the last of his line. He died in London on 2 November 2015, aged 91. After a funeral service at the Brompton Oratory, London, his remains were taken to their final resting place in the crypt of the Knights of Malta in the parish church of Mistrzejowice, Kraków.

Distinctions

Polish
 Order of the White Eagle (1998)
 Order of Polonia Restituta
 Grand Cross (25 February 1993) – in recognition of his outstanding contribution to Polish culture
 Commander's Cross with Star (1986, London)
 Gold Medal for Merit to Culture (Gloria Artis) (2006)
 Cross of Merit with Swords (1944)
 Cross of the September Campaign (1984)
 Cross of the Polish Home Army (Krzyż Armia Krajowa) (1995)
 Cross of the Warsaw Uprising (1995)
 Army Medal for War 1939-45, 3 times
 Veteran's Cross (SPK, London)
 Gold Medal of Merit of the Polish National Treasury (London)
 Merentibus Medal (Jagiellonian University, Cracow) (1986)
 Gold Cross of Merit of the Polish Catholic Church

Other
 Grand Cross of the Order of St. Gregory the Great (Vatican)
 Bailiff Grand Cross of Honour & Devotion, Sovereign Military Order of Malta (previously Grand Cross of Order Pro Merito Melitensi)
 Grand Officer of the Order of Merit of the Italian Republic
 Commander of the Order of the Polar Star (Sweden)
 Grand Decoration of Honour in Silver for Services to the Republic of Austria.
 Commander of the Order of Merit of Senegal
 Officer's Cross of the Order of Merit of the Federal Republic of Germany
 Officer of the Legion of Honour (France)
 Order of Friendship of Peoples (Belarus)
 Order of Francisc Skorina (Belarus)

Dynastic orders
 Knight of the Order of St Januarius (Two Sicilies)
 Bailiff Grand Cross of Justice of the Sacred Military Constantinian Order of Saint George with Collar (Two Sicilies)
 Grand Cross of the Royal Order of Francis I (Two Sicilies)
 Gold Medal of the Sacred Military Constantinian Order of Saint George (Two Sicilies)
 Grand Cross of the Order of Saints Maurice and Lazarus (Savoy)
 Grand Cross of the Order of Merit of the House of Savoy (Savoy)
 Gold Medal of Merit of the House of Savoy (Savoy)
 Knight of Justice of the Order of Saint Stephen (Tuscany)
 Grand Cross of the Order of Saint Joseph (Tuscany)
 Grand Cross of the Order of St Andrew (Imperial Russia)
 Grand Cross of the Order of St. Alexander Nevsky (Imperial Russia)
 Grand Cross of the Order of St. Anna (Imperial Russia)

Honorary Awards
He was granted Honorary doctorates by the following academic bodies:
 University of Warsaw, Poland (1991)
 University of New Mexico, Albuquerque, USA (1992)
 Belarusian State University, Minsk, Belarus (1993)
 Jagiellonian University, Kraków, Poland (2009)
 Freedom of the town of Ciechanowiec 
 Honorary Membership of the Polish Heraldic Society, Warsaw (1992)
 Honorary member of the Institute of History of the Belarusian Academy of Sciences
 Honorary Professorship of the Academy of Fine Arts in Warsaw

There were other awards and "Festschrifts", both in Poland and other countries.  
He was awarded Honorary Freedom of the town of Ciechanowiec, (Poland) and of Zaslawye, (Belarus).

See also
 List of Poles
 Poles in the United Kingdom
 Szlachta

References

Bibliography
  Białonowska, Magdalena. Andrzej Stanisław Ciechanowiecki: Kolekcjoner, marszand i mecenas. Lublin: Towarzystwo Naukowe KUL 2012. 
  Barnes, Joanna. "Andrew Ciechanowiecki: 1924–2015" 3rd dimension 9 December 2015. . [retrieved 2018.12.02]. An extended obituary of the art historian.
  Montagu, Jennifer. "Andrew Stanislaus [Andrzej Stanisław] Ciechanowiecki, 1924–2015" Burlington Magazine obituary. [retrieved 2018.12.02]. 
  Szejnert, Małgorzata.	Usypać góry. Historie z Polesia published by Otwarte, 2015. 
  Piwocka, M. Andrzej Ciechanowiecki i dziedzictwo Słonimia, "Studia Waweliana", Vol XIV, 2009, pp. 265–272 (PL ISSN 1230-3275).
  Zamoyski, Adam. The Apollo Portrait : Andrew Ciechanowiecki, in Apollo, July 1987.
  Knox, Tim Art in Trust for Poland, in Apollo, June 2005.
  Demoriane, H. Vous aussi, devenez collectionneurs de bronzes, in Connaissance des Arts, Paris 1965.
  Coignard, Jérôme, Esquisses d’une vie : vente de la collection d’esquisses peintes françaises du XVIIe au XIXe siècle d’André Ciechanowiecki, Drouot-Richelieu, Paris, le 28 Juin 2002, in Connaissance des Arts, Paris, June 2002.
  Heim Gallery and Old Masters Gallery, 1965–1994, records
  Communiqué on the granting of the Order of the White Eagle
  Ciechanowiecki, A. S. "Speeches given on the occasion of the conferral of honorary membership of the Association of Art Historians"

External links
 Debrett's People of Today: Count Andrew Ciechanowiecki, biography. 
 Finding aid for Heim Gallery records, Getty Research Institute, Los Angeles. Accession No. 910004. London gallery directed by Andrew Ciechanowiecki. Records include extensive correspondence with museums, galleries, collectors, and other colleagues in Europe and the United States. Photographs document paintings, drawings, sculptures, and decorative art sold and exhibited by, and offered to the gallery. 

1924 births
2015 deaths
Writers from Warsaw
Polish philanthropists
Polish art historians
Polish antiquarians
Bibliophiles
Polish book and manuscript collectors
Polish art collectors
Jagiellonian University alumni
Nobility from Kraków
University of Tübingen alumni
Cold War spies
Polish emigrants to the United Kingdom
Naturalised citizens of the United Kingdom
Grand Crosses of the Order of Polonia Restituta
Recipients of the Gold Medal for Merit to Culture – Gloria Artis
Recipients of the Cross of Merit with Swords (Poland)
Recipients of the Armia Krajowa Cross
Knights Grand Cross of the Order of St Gregory the Great
Grand Officers of the Order of Merit of the Italian Republic
Commanders of the Order of the Polar Star
Officers Crosses of the Order of Merit of the Federal Republic of Germany
Officiers of the Légion d'honneur
Recipients of the Order of Francysk Skaryna
Knights Grand Cross of the Order of Saints Maurice and Lazarus
Recipients of the Order of St. Anna, 1st class
Recipients of the Grand Decoration for Services to the Republic of Austria
People detained by the Polish Ministry of Public Security
Recipients of the Order of the White Eagle (Poland)
Polish patrons of the arts